Thyonicola dogieli is a  parasitic species of gastropod mollusc in the family Eulimidae. It parasitises sea cucumbers in the northeastern Pacific Ocean.

Description
This slender elongated mollusc does not have a shell and takes the form of a long tube, coiled like a spring, or tied in knots, and filled with eggs.

Ecology
Thyonicola dogieli is a parasite of sea cucumbers such as Cucumaria miniata. It inhabits the gut of the sea cucumber, being attached at the anterior end. It has no digestive tract and  absorbs nutrients through its cuticle. It is a hermaphrodite; the testis is located near the anterior end and the ovary near the posterior end (this enables the sperm to be carried to the eggs amid the flow of the contents of the host's gut). The body is filled with maturing eggs enclosed in cocoons. When the veliger larvae, which have miniature coiled shells and operculums, are sufficiently developed, the cocoons are released into the sea cucumber's gut and pass out into the sea with its faeces.

On encountering sea water the cocoons burst open and the free-living larvae are liberated. As the juvenile mollusc grows, its posterior end pushes its way into the sea cucumber's body cavity, and the gonads develop, the interior of the mollusc becoming a brood pouch.

References

Eulimidae
Gastropods described in 1945